William Leonard Dunderdale (6 February 1915 – 11 January 1989) was an English association footballer who played as a centre forward.

Playing career

Born in Lincolnshire, Dunderdale started his career at Goole Town in the East Riding of Yorkshire. He joined Sheffield Wednesday as a 19-year-old amateur in March 1934, turning professional at the end of the season. After being released in June 1935, he joined Walsall the following year. During his first full season for the club, he scored seven goals in one reserve game. In his second, he scored a hat-trick in Walsall's 3–1 win over Watford on 23 October 1937. Dunderdale was sold to Watford in 1938, for a fee of £1,000. His spell at Vicarage Road was a short one; he played 33 games in all competitions, and ended up being the club's top scorer with 21 goals, including a hat-trick in his final game.

However, Dunderdale did not actually finish the season at Watford; in March 1939 the club accepted a £3,750 bid for his services from Leeds United. His competitive Leeds career was cut short by the Second World War. During this time he made wartime appearances for Grimsby Town, Mansfield Town, Lincoln City and Watford. After the war he returned to Watford, although he was less successful than before. He had put on considerable weight, and became unpopular with supporters, eventually being granted a free transfer in 1948. He joined Kent League outfit Sittingbourne for the 1948–49 season, before retiring as a player.

Later career

Following his retirement, Dunderdale fulfilled coaching and scouting roles at various clubs, including Berkhamsted Town, Sun Sports and Watford. He died in Saxilby, Lincolnshire on 11 January 1989, aged 73.

References

1915 births
1989 deaths
People from Willingham by Stow
English footballers
English Football League players
Goole Town F.C. players
Sheffield Wednesday F.C. players
Walsall F.C. players
Watford F.C. players
Leeds United F.C. players
Grimsby Town F.C. wartime guest players
Lincoln City F.C. wartime guest players
Mansfield Town F.C. wartime guest players
Watford F.C. wartime guest players
Watford F.C. non-playing staff
Sittingbourne F.C. players
Association football forwards